John Byset the Elder, Lord of the Aird (died 1257) was a Scoto-Norman nobleman who is the progenitor of the Bissett family of the Glens of Antrim in medieval northeastern Ireland, present-day Northern Ireland.

Biography
Born in Scotland, certain details of what is known of his life are limited. John fled to Ireland and then to England, with his uncle Walter Byset, Lord of Aboyne after Walter had been complicit in the murder of Padraig, Earl of Atholl. They were received into the peace of King Henry III of England. Among these are the date of his death as recorded in the Annals of Ulster. His name has the distinction of being the ancestral element in the Gaelic style Mac Eoin (Bissett) of the Glens used by his descendants in Ireland into the 16th century.

He is known to have had a son John Bissett of Lovat.

According to some sources it was Byset who founded Beauly Priory in the year 1230.

See also
 Clan Bissett

References

Bibliography

 
  Calendar of Documents, Relating to Ireland, 1171-1251.
 Chisholm-Batten, Edmund, The Charters of the Priory of Beauly with Notices of the Priories of Pluscardine and Ardchattan and of the Family of the Founder John Byset. London: Houlston & Sons. 1877. alt
 Duffy, Seán, "The Lords of Galloway, Earls of Carrick, and the Bissets of the Glens: Scottish settlement in medieval Ulster", in David Edwards (ed.), Regions and Rulers in Ireland, 1100-1650. Four Courts. 2003.
 H., J. W., The Earldom and Barons of Ulster, in The Ulster Journal of Archaeology, Vol. I. Belfast: Archer & Sons. 1853. pp. 38–42. alt. JSTOR.
 Hill, George, An Historical Account of the MacDonnells of Antrim: Including Notices of some other Septs, Irish and Scottish. Belfast: Archer & Sons. 1873. alt
 Nicholls, K. W., "Anglo-French Ireland and after", in Peritia 1 (1982): 370–403.
 Roberts, John Lenox. (1997) "Lost Kingdoms: Celtic Scotland and the Middle Ages" 
 Way, George and Squire, Romily. (1994). Collins Scottish Clan & Family Encyclopedia. (Foreword by The Rt Hon. The Earl of Elgin KT, Convenor, The Standing Council of Scottish Chiefs).

John
1257 deaths
13th-century Scottish people
13th-century Irish people
People from County Antrim
Year of birth unknown